NGC 4676, or the Mice Galaxies, are two spiral galaxies in the constellation Coma Berenices. About 290 million light-years distant, they have begun the process of colliding and merging. Their name refers to the long tails produced by tidal action—the relative difference between gravitational pulls on the near and far parts of each galaxy—known here as a galactic tide. It is a possibility that both galaxies, which are members of the Coma Cluster, have experienced collision, and will continue colliding until they coalesce.

The colors of the galaxies are peculiar. In NGC 4676A a core with some dark markings is surrounded by a bluish white remnant of spiral arms. The tail is unusual, starting out blue and terminating in a more yellowish color, despite the fact that the beginning of each arm in virtually every spiral galaxy starts yellow and terminates in a bluish color. NGC 4676B has a yellowish core and two arcs; arm remnants underneath are bluish as well.

The galaxies were photographed in 2002 by the Hubble Space Telescope. In the background of the Mice Galaxies, there are at least 3,300 galaxies, at distances up to 13 billion light-years.

See also
Antennae Galaxies
Interacting galaxy
NGC 7318
List of galaxies

References

Notes

External links

The Mice Galaxies

Lenticular galaxies
Peculiar galaxies
Interacting galaxies
Irregular galaxies
Barred lenticular galaxies
Coma Cluster
Coma Berenices
NGC objects
IC objects
07938
43062
242